The Monastery of the Precious Blood is a building in southeast Portland, Oregon, United States, listed on the National Register of Historic Places. It is in the Montavilla neighborhood.

See also
 National Register of Historic Places listings in Southeast Portland, Oregon

References

Further reading

External links
 

1923 establishments in Oregon
Buildings and structures completed in 1923
Montavilla, Portland, Oregon
National Register of Historic Places in Portland, Oregon
Portland Historic Landmarks
Properties of religious function on the National Register of Historic Places in Oregon
Roman Catholic Archdiocese of Portland in Oregon
Roman Catholic monasteries in the United States
Spanish Colonial Revival architecture in the United States